The 2020 ANZ Premiership season was the fourth season of Netball New Zealand's ANZ Premiership. With a team coached by Yvette McCausland-Durie, captained by Katrina Rore and featuring Karin Burger, Aliyah Dunn and Ameliaranne Ekenasio, Central Pulse finished the regular season as minor premiers. In the grand final, Pulse defeated Mainland Tactix 43–31, winning their second consecutive premiership. Throughout the season, Netball New Zealand had to deal with considerable disruption because of the COVID-19 pandemic. This initially saw the league suspended for April and May. On its return in June, Round 2 through to Round 7 matches were all played behind closed doors at a single venue. In August, all Round 10 and two Final Series matches were cancelled and the Grand final was played behind closed doors.

Transfers

Head coaches and captains

Pre-season

2019 Super Club
In December 2019 all six ANZ Premiership teams plus Collingwood Magpies from Suncorp Super Netball and Wasps Netball from the Netball Superleague competed in the 2019 Netball New Zealand Super Club. The staging of the 2019 Super Club was delayed because of the 2019 Netball World Cup. This effectively made it a pre-2020 season tournament for the teams involved. Magpies won the 2019 tournament after defeating Northern Mystics 49–42 in the final.

Otaki tournament
The official pre-season tournament was held at Te Wānanga o Raukawa in Otaki between 28 February and 1 March, with all six teams competing.

Day 1

 
 

 
Day 2

 
  
 
 
Day 3

Impact of COVID-19 pandemic

Season suspended
On 16 March 2020, due to the COVID-19 pandemic, the final match of Round 1, between Southern Steel and Waikato Bay of Plenty Magic, was played in an empty arena. On 20 March it was announced that Rounds 2 and 3 had been suspended. and on 26 March, Netball New Zealand announced that the whole season was suspended indefinitely.

Return
In May, Netball New Zealand announced that the season would resume in June. Rounds 2 to 7 would all subsequently be played behind closed doors at a single venue, Auckland Netball Centre. On the leagues return, some changes to the format were introduced, partly because of the pandemic. Matches would now feature 12 minute quarters with 10 minute half-time breaks. There was also a change to the points system. A win was now worth 4 points, a draw would equal 2 points and there was a bonus point for teams that only lost matches by 5 or less goals. The Finals Series was also due to feature 5th/6th and 3rd/4th place playoff matches as well as a Grand final. The season restarted on 19 June with a match between Northern Mystics and Waikato Bay of Plenty Magic.

Regular season

Round 1

Round 2

Round 3

Round 4

Round 5

Round 6

Round 7

Round 8

Round 9

Round 10 
On 12 August, after a change in the COVID-19 alert levels in New Zealand, Netball New Zealand announced that all five Round 10 matches would be cancelled. The five matches, which had no bearing on the final placings for the Finals Series, where all declared draws and each team was awarded two points.

Final ladder

Finals Series
The Finals Series was due to feature 5th/6th and 3rd/4th place playoff matches as well as a Grand final. However, the two Auckland Region-based teams, Northern Mystics and Northern Stars, were unable to travel because the region was in lockdown. Both playoff matches were subsequently cancelled and the Grand final was played behind closed doors.

5th/6th place match

3rd/4th place match

Grand final

Award winners

New Zealand Netball Awards

Team of the season
Brendon Egan selected Stuff's team of the season.

Season statistics

References

 
2020
2020 in New Zealand netball
Sports events affected by the COVID-19 pandemic